The Bauakademie (Building Academy) in Berlin, Germany, was a higher education school for the art of building to train master builders.  It originated from the construction department of the Academy of Fine Arts and Mechanical Sciences (from 1704), which emphasized the aesthetic elements of art of building while ignoring the technical.  Thus, the governmental Upper Building Department ("UBD") decided to establish an entirely new building educational institution named "Bauakademie".  It was founded on 18 March 1799 by King Frederick William III and, in 1801, incorporated into the UBD, as its section.

History
The building of the Building Academy (Bauakademie), built between 1832 and 1836 (later known as Schinkel's Bauakademie), is considered one of the forerunners of modern architecture due to its hithertofore uncommon use of red brick and the relatively streamlined facade of the building. Designed by Karl Friedrich Schinkel, it was built near the Berlin City Palace and accommodated two royal Prussian institutions: the State Construction Commission (Oberbaudeputation), of which Schinkel was the director, and – first of all – the Building Academy (institution), which in 1879 gave birth to the Royal Technical Higher School (Königlich Technische Hochschule Charlottenburg) – the forerunner of the Technical University of Berlin. 

For nearly 50 years (1885–1933), the Bauakademie became the home of the "Königlich Preussische Messbild-Anstalt" renamed to "Staatliche Bildstelle" in 1921. This institution, under its director Albrecht Meydenbauer, became the first world-wide office professionally working with photogrammetry and establishing an archive of historical buildings based on photography. By 1920, approximately 20.000 glass-negatives of the format 30x30 cm and 40x40 cm had been collected in Germany and abroad.

During the Weimar period, the Bauakademie was the home of the famous Deutsche Hochschule für Politik as well as other institutions supported by the State of Prussia.

Damaged during World War II, the Bauakademie was then partially restored, but in 1962 the building was demolished to make room for the future Ministry of Foreign Affairs of East Germany.

In 1995, the Ministry of Foreign Affairs of East Germany was demolished in order to recreate the Werderscher Markt area. Since then, proposals to rebuild Schinkel's Bauakademie have been discussed with city and Federal authorities. The Werderscher Markt area has already been partially recreated by the Bertelsmann-funded reconstruction of the Alte Kommandantur. As for the Bauakademie, between 2000 and 2001 students erected a temporary structure to give an impression of the volume and form of the building. On 11 November 2016, the German Bundestag decided to rebuild the building academy according to the motto "As much Schinkel as possible". The cost of the project is estimated at 51 million euros.

Reconstruction

After the GDR foreign ministry was demolished in 1995–1996, there were increasing demands for a reconstruction of the Schinkel Building Academy. The Bauakademie sponsorship association, founded in 1994, suggested that it be rebuilt as an international innovation, exhibition and event center with adapted interiors and faithful facades. 2001–2002 the north-east corner was rebuilt as a model facade and the red hall as a model room for the building academy. Subsequently, the neighboring Schinkelplatz was restored in its historical form in 2007–2008. Between 2004 and 2019, a giant poster recreated the original exterior view of the Bauakademie, similar to the previous oneCity Palace .

In October 2016, the President of the Prussian Cultural Heritage Foundation, Hermann Parzinger, advocated for the reconstruction of the Bauakademie, with the proposal to use the building as an architecture museum. Berlin has architectural collections, such as those in the art library and the state library, in the architecture museum of Technical University of Berlin, in the Academy of the Arts, and in the Berlinische Galerie, but no major architectural museums. "Isn't it a fascinating idea to finally bring all the treasures of these institutions together in one center?"

On 11 November 2016, the German Bundestag decided to release 62 million euros for the reconstruction of the building academy. It should be a "national showcase, forum and workshop in one" for current topics relating to architecture , construction and urban development as well as another cultural focus on Museum Island , which is "committed to the historical model and dedicated to all construction". In order to promote the reconstruction, the state of Berlin sold the property to the federal government. Construction is expected to start in 2021.

On 7 May 2018, the Federal Ministry of the Interior announced the results of an internationally open program competition for the building academy to be rebuilt. In August 2018, Berlin's Senator for Construction Katrin Lompscher (Die Linke) spoke out in favor of the reconstruction of the Bauakademie under the motto "As much Schinkel as possible". The implementation competition for the building should "take into account Schinkel's specifications for the building, structure and facade". In January 2019, the Federal Bauakademie Foundation was founded as the supporting organization for the reconstruction of the building. In November 2019, the SPD politician Florian Pronoldas the founding director and in January 2020 the cultural manager Julia Rust von Krosigk was elected as the vice director of the Bundesstiftung Bauakademie. Pronold's election provoked criticism in parts of the architecture community, which the Federal Ministry of the Interior, the Building Academy and Pronold himself rejected. Two competitors filed a lawsuit against the recruitment process. On 7 January, the labor court in Berlin issued an injunction in the proceedings of the plaintiff Philipp Oswalt , which prohibited the foundation from filling the director's position with Pronold, as the proceedings did not meet the requirements of the best selection that apply to public office. On 10 March 2020, Pronold announced that it would not take up the position as director On 12 June, the regional labor court confirmed the temporary injunction as a second instance on the grounds that the Federal Bauakademie Foundation is "designed according to the rules of the statutes in the sense of continued state control. The Federal Republic of Germany as the founder, represented by the Federal Government, represented by the Federal Ministries, has a continuing significant influence in the sense of a possible implementation of essential decisions. There is a financial and personal dependency, 'ruling through' in the above sense is possible. " On 9 September 2020, the Federal Ministry of the Interior for Building and Home Affairs announced that the director's position would be based on the judgment of the Berlin-Brandenburg State Labor Courtis rewritten.

References

External links

 Internationale Bauakademie Berlin
 

Buildings and structures in Berlin
Demolished buildings and structures in Berlin
Karl Friedrich Schinkel buildings
Prussian cultural sites
Building reconstruction projects in Germany
Rebuilt buildings and structures in Berlin
Buildings and structures demolished in 1962